James S. Garvin was an Arizona politician who served a single term in the Arizona State Senate during the 2nd Arizona State Legislature.  He easily defeated his two opponents, William Mulroney, a Socialist, and Andrew White, running as a non-partisan.  Garvin received 1137 votes, with White getting 648 and Mulroney 163.

Garvin was a farmer and cotton broker.  Garvin died on February 9, 1945.

References

Democratic Party Arizona state senators
1945 deaths